Zechariah 5 is the fifth of the total 14 chapters in the Book of Zechariah in the Hebrew Bible or the Old Testament of the Christian Bible. This book contains the prophecies attributed to the prophet Zechariah, and is a part of the Book of the Twelve Minor Prophets. This chapter records the sixth and seventh of the eight visions of Zechariah which are compiled in a section (so-called "First Zechariah") consisting of Zechariah 1–8.

Text
The original text was written in the Hebrew language. This chapter is divided into 11 verses.

Textual witnesses
Some early manuscripts containing the text of this chapter in Hebrew are of the Masoretic Text, which includes the Codex Cairensis (from year 895), the Petersburg Codex of the Prophets (916), and Codex Leningradensis (1008).

Fragments containing parts of this chapter were found among the Dead Sea Scrolls, that is, 4Q80 (4QXIIe; 75–50 BCE) with extant verses 8–11.

There is also a translation into Koine Greek known as the Septuagint, made in the last few centuries BCE. Extant ancient manuscripts of the Septuagint version include Codex Vaticanus (B; B; 4th century), Codex Sinaiticus (S; BHK: S; 4th century), Codex Alexandrinus (A; A; 5th century) and Codex Marchalianus (Q; Q; 6th century).

Vision of the flying scroll (5:1–4)
The sixth vision of the flying scroll indicates how the word of
the Lord will be materialized to be 'scripture', as a gold standard to assess and cleanse the community. The covenant curse shows that the covenant does remain in force despite having
once been broken.

Vision of a woman in the basket (5:5–11)
The seventh of the eight visions uncovers a woman in a basket (Hebrew: 'epa) symbolizing the iniquity of the people (Hebrew 'eye'). A feminine idol (to be stood 'on its base' in a 'house' or temple) is to be symbolically exiled to Babylon while Judaism becomes fully a YHWH-alone religion.

Verse 7
 And, behold, there was lifted up a talent of lead:
 and this is a woman that sitteth in the midst of the ephah.
In the next verse it is called, "the weight of lead."
 "A talent of lead":  A kikkar (or cicar), or "talent of silver" in the Jewish tradition was equal to 3,000 shekels ( and weighed between 120 to 125 pounds. Since the Hebrew word "cicar" signifies something 'plain', and 'extended like a cake', as Arias Montanus observes, it may here refer to a plate of lead, which was laid over the mouth of the "ephah", as a lid unto it; though indeed it is afterwards called, "a stone of lead", and so seems to design a weight.
 "This is a woman" - Literally, "one woman," to personified 'all sins' or 'wickedness' (cf. Proverbs 2:16; 5:3, 4). The sitting may represent her abiding tranquil condition in her sins, according to the climax in Psalm 1:1-6, "and hath not sat in the seat of the scornful" (Psalm 1:1); and, "thou sittest and speakest against thy brother" (Psalm 50:20).

See also
 Shinar
Related Bible parts: Zechariah 1, Zechariah 2, Zechariah 3, Zechariah 4, Zechariah 6

Notes

References

Sources

External links

Jewish
Zechariah 5 Hebrew with Parallel English
Zechariah 5 Hebrew with Rashi's Commentary

Christian
Zechariah 5 English Translation with Parallel Latin Vulgate 

05